Pine Grove Township is the name of some places in the U.S. state of Pennsylvania:

 Pine Grove Township, Schuylkill County, Pennsylvania
 Pine Grove Township, Warren County, Pennsylvania
 Pinegrove Township, Venango County, Pennsylvania

Pennsylvania township disambiguation pages